Milna (Shinshiru-dake) is a somma volcano located at the southern end of Simushir Island, Kuril Islands, Russia. It is the highest point of the island.

See also
 List of volcanoes in Russia

References 
 

Simushir
Volcanoes of the Kuril Islands